"English Boy" is a song by Pete Townshend, released as the first and only single from his 1993 album Psychoderelict. The song is used to introduce the character Ray High, as well as journalist Ruth Streeting, host of Street on the Street. Townshend has said the song is about "the emergence of the modern punk", and has been referred to as the focus point for the entire album. There are three versions of this song:

 the first, lengthier version features dialog by Ruth Streeting over instrumental parts of the song.
 the second was released as an edited, no dialog version, and appeared on both single releases in 1993 and on the Pete Townshend compilation albums coolwalkingsmoothtalkingstraightsmokingfirestoking, Anthology, and Gold.
 a reprise, which ends the album and features a slightly different backing (including harmonica by Peter Hope-Evans and additional cowbell) and dialog by Ray High, wrapping up the album and imploring "what happened to all that lovely hippie shit?"

B-sides 
Two exclusive tracks were released on different single releases of "English Boy".

 "Psycho Montage" is a compilation of dialogue related to the narrative.
 "Electronic Wizardry" is an instrumental demo derived from the Lifehouse project.

Single release
In the UK, the song was released as a single in the following variations:
 "English Boy" (non-dialog) / "English Boy" (dialog) (7" vinyl)
 "English Boy" (dialog) / "Fake It" / "Psycho Montage" (CD single 1)
 "English Boy" (non-dialog) / "Fake It" / "Flame" (Simon Townshend demo) / "Early Morning Dreams" (Pete Townshend demo) (CD single 2)

References

1993 songs
1993 singles
Pete Townshend songs
Songs written by Pete Townshend
Song recordings produced by Pete Townshend
Atlantic Records singles